Mary Joseph, famously known as Meena (22 April 1941 – 17 September 1997), was an Indian actress. She primarily appeared in Malayalam movies. She died on 17 September 1997 due to a cardiac arrest.

Early life
Meena (Mary Joseph) was the eighth child in a Marthoma Syrian Christian family from kumarapuram-haripad, in Alappuzha. Born on 22 April 1941 to Koyikkaleth Itty Cheria Eapen  and his wife, Eleyamma Eapen, she began her early career in theatre in Kalanilayam and Geetha Arts Club. Her film debut in Malayalam was in Kudumbini.

Personal life
She was married to K.K. Joseph. She died on 17 September 1997 on the set of Anjara Kalyanam. She is survived by her only daughter Dr Elizabeth and her son in law Sunny George and grandchild Sarah Lisa Sunny.

Filmography

Dramas
 Nirdhoshi

References

External links
 
Meena at MSI

1941 births
1997 deaths
20th-century Indian actresses
Actresses from Alappuzha
Actresses in Malayalam cinema
Indian film actresses
Place of death missing
Actresses in Malayalam theatre